Fram is an impact crater located within the Meridiani Planum extraterrestrial plain, situated within the Margaritifer Sinus quadrangle (MC-19) region of the planet Mars. It was visited by the rover Opportunity (MER-B) on Sol 84, April 24, 2004.

Opportunity paused beside it while travelling from the rover's landing site toward a larger crater, Endurance.

It is named after the famous Norwegian polar exploration vessel the Fram, a ship used by many famous Norwegian explorers such as Fridtjof Nansen, Otto Sverdrup, Oscar Wisting, and Roald Amundsen.

See also 
 Geography of Mars
 List of craters on Mars

References

External links 
 Official Mars Rovers website
 Martian Concretions Near Fram Crater

Additional Reading  
 Science Magazine Special Issue (Vol. 306, Issue 5702, December 2004): Opportunity at Meridiani Planum. This issue mentions Fram Crater in multiple papers:
Mineralogy at Meridiani Planum from the Mini-TES Experiment on the Opportunity Rover
Soils of Eagle Crater and Meridiani Planum at the Opportunity Rover Landing Site
Localization and Physical Property Experiments Conducted by Opportunity at Meridiani Planum

Mars exploration rover surface operations: driving opportunity at Meridiani Planum (IEEE Robotics & Automation, 2006)

Impact craters on Mars
Margaritifer Sinus quadrangle